The 2017 Istanbul Open (also known as the TEB BNP Paribas Istanbul Open for sponsorship purposes) was a men's tennis tournament played on outdoor clay courts. It was the third edition of the Istanbul Open, and an ATP World Tour 250 event. It took place at the Koza World of Sports Arena in Istanbul, Turkey, from 1–7 May 2017.

Singles main draw entrants

Seeds

Rankings are as of April 24, 2017.

Other entrants
The following players received wildcards into the main draw:
  Marin Čilić
  Márton Fucsovics 
  Cem İlkel 

The following player received entry as a special exempt:
  Laslo Đere

The following players received entry via the qualifying draw:
  Riccardo Bellotti 
  Daniel Brands 
  Adrián Menéndez-Maceiras 
  Stefanos Tsitsipas

The following player received entry as a lucky loser:
  Mohamed Safwat

Withdrawals
Before the tournament
  Radu Albot →replaced by  Mohamed Safwat

Doubles main draw entrants

Seeds

 Rankings are as of April 24, 2017.

Other entrants
The following pairs received wildcards into the doubles main draw:
  Tuna Altuna /  Alessandro Motti
  Altuğ Çelikbilek /  Cem İlkel

Champions

Singles

  Marin Čilić def.  Milos Raonic, 7–6(7–3), 6–3

Doubles

  Roman Jebavý /  Jiří Veselý def.  Tuna Altuna /  Alessandro Motti 6–0, 6–0

References

External links
Official website

2017 in Istanbul
2017 in Turkish tennis
2017
May 2017 sports events in Turkey
2017 ATP World Tour